Eunidia coiffaiti is a species of beetle in the family Cerambycidae that was first described by Stephan von Breuning in 1977. It is mainly found on the East part of the African continent.

References

Eunidiini
Beetles described in 1977